Kenwood is an unincorporated community and census-designated place (CDP) in Delaware and Mayes counties, Oklahoma, United States. As of the 2010 census it had a population of 1,224.

Kenwood once had a post office, which opened on May 25, 1922. The community's name came from a combination of William Kennedy and the National Hardwood Company.

Demographics

References

Census-designated places in Delaware County, Oklahoma
Census-designated places in Mayes County, Oklahoma
Census-designated places in Oklahoma